Anthropotokos (Greek: ἀνθρωποτόκος) is a title that was ascribed to Mary the Mother of Jesus by certain Christians around the time of the Nestorian debates. It literally means "the one who gives birth to a man" (ἄνθρωπος, man; τόκος, parturition, childbirth), but is also loosely translated as "mother of man", parallel to and contrasted with theotokos. Both Cyril of Alexandria (representing the orthodox viewpoint) and Nestorius (representing the Nestorian view) rejected the use of this word.

References

Titles of Mary